Igor Sláma (born 8 May 1959) is a retired amateur track cyclist from Czechoslovakia. He won a gold medal in the points race at the 1979 World Championships and a bronze medal in the 4000 m team pursuit at the 1980 Summer Olympics.

References

1959 births
Living people
Sportspeople from Brno
Czech male cyclists
Czechoslovak male cyclists
Olympic cyclists of Czechoslovakia
Cyclists at the 1980 Summer Olympics
Olympic medalists in cycling
Olympic bronze medalists for Czechoslovakia
Medalists at the 1980 Summer Olympics